"Only Love (The Ballad of Sleeping Beauty)" is a song by American singer-songwriter Sophie B. Hawkins, which was released in 1996 as the fifth and final single from her second studio album Whaler (1994). The song was written by Hawkins and produced by Stephen Lipson. "Only Love" peaked at No. 49 on the US Billboard Hot 100. The song's music video was directed by Bonnie Hoffenberg.

Background
For its release as a single, "Only Love" was remixed, much to the disapproval of Hawkins. She told Steve Morse of The Boston Globe in 1996, "I said, 'You've taken all the soul out of the song.' It makes me want to get in there and say, 'What is the matter with you?' People say I shouldn't talk about this, but I'd rather be truthful. The artist is the one who changes the world, not the industry."

Critical reception
On its release as a single, Larry Flick of Billboard described "Only Love" as a "charming sing-along ditty". He felt the chorus is "rife with earnest references to the residual effects of sharing love" which Hawkins "delivers with sweet sincerity".

Track listing
CD and cassette single (US release)
"Only Love (The Ballad Of Sleeping Beauty)" (Radio Edit) - 4:06
"Did We Not Choose Each Other" - 4:25

CD single (US promo)
"Only Love (The Ballad Of Sleeping Beauty)" (Radio Edit) - 4:06
"Only Love (The Ballad Of Sleeping Beauty)" (Acoustic Version) - 4:44

CD single (Australian release)
"Only Love (The Ballad Of Sleeping Beauty)" (Radio Edit) - 4:06
"Only Love (The Ballad Of Sleeping Beauty)" (LP Version) - 5:05
"Only Love (The Ballad Of Sleeping Beauty)" (Acoustic Version) - 4:44
"Did We Not Choose Each Other" - 4:25

Personnel
Only Love (The Ballad of Sleeping Beauty)
 Sophie B. Hawkins - vocals, keyboards, programming
 Stephen Lipson - bass, programming
 Peter Vettese - keyboards
 Neil Conti - drum set

Production
 Stephen Lipson - producer
 Sophie B. Hawkins, Randy Jackson - additional production on "Radio Edit" and "Acoustic Version"
 Brian Malouf - mixing
 Heff Moraes - engineer

Charts

References

1996 songs
1996 singles
Sophie B. Hawkins songs
Columbia Records singles
Songs written by Sophie B. Hawkins
Song recordings produced by Stephen Lipson